Harald Kråkenes (8 July 1926 – 14 November 2004) was a Norwegian competition rower and Olympic medalist. He received a bronze medal in the coxed eight event at the 1948 Summer Olympics, as a member of the Norwegian team. His brother Thorstein was a member of the same Olympic bronze team. His brother Sverre is also a competition rower, who participated in the 1952 and 1960 Olympic games.

Kråkenes received a bronze medal in coxless four at the 1949 European championships. He participated in fours at the 1952 Summer Olympics, and in double sculls at the 1960 Summer Olympics.

References

1926 births
2004 deaths
Norwegian male rowers
Olympic rowers of Norway
Rowers at the 1948 Summer Olympics
Rowers at the 1952 Summer Olympics
Rowers at the 1960 Summer Olympics
Olympic bronze medalists for Norway
Olympic medalists in rowing
Medalists at the 1948 Summer Olympics
European Rowing Championships medalists